From Dreams To Reality: A Tribute to Minority Inventors is a 1986 documentary featuring African-American actor, writer and director Ossie Davis. It features several notable African Americans, Native Americans, Asian Americans, and Latinos who have made significant contributions to science, technology, and medicine. With a 27-minute runtime, the documentary film was executive produced by Robert B. Amdur  and the U.S. Patent and Trademark Office (USPTO) to encourage more Americans to prepare for and consider careers in science and technology.

Plot

Davis begins the film with a tour of the U.S. Patent Office in Virginia, a facility that processes over four million patents yearly.

The film profiles the following scientists:

 Louis Latimer, an African American collaborator with Thomas Edison. Latimer is credited with numerous patents including advances in Electricity
 Randall Woods, an African American inventor responsible for over sixty railroad industry patents including the three-rail system currently used in subway cars
 George Washington Carver, African American inventor and scientist at Tuskegee Institute. he is noted for his agricultural and chemical research with numerous plants including peanuts. 
 Garrett Morgan, an African American inventor who patented the traffic signal
 Dr. Charles Drew, an African American physician who modernized methods to preserve blood plasma. 
 Dr. An Wang, an Asian American inventor with patents involving the basic digital computer machine.
 Philip Stevens, a Native American inventor of defense system missiles.
 Ysidore Martinez, an Hispanic American inventor of knee implants for victims of arthritis. 
 Dr. Meredith Gourdine, an African American inventor responsible for designing a fog dispersal system used on airport runways.
 Mildred Smith, an African American inventor of the genealogy game "Family Traditions".

Cast and crew
 Ossie Davis - Narrator
 Robert B. Amdur - Executive Producer
 Vicki Kodama - Director, Writer, Producer
 EVKO Productions - Producer
 Nicholas Anderson - Editor
 Patricia Carter Sluby - Technical Advisor  
 William Mears - Original Music
 Nicholas Anderson - Guitar Music
 Bob Waybright- Director of Photography
 Animation House, Inc. - Animation

References

Documentary films about African Americans
1986 short films
American documentary films
1986 films
1980s American films